CPRM is Content Protection for Recordable Media.

CPRM may also refer to:

 Communist Party of Revolutionary Marxists
 Companhia Portuguesa de Rádio Marconi, a Portuguese postal, telegraph and telephone service
Companhia de Pesquisa de Recursos Minerais, a Brazilian government enterprise